Club Egara is a Spanish sports club based in Terrassa, Catalonia. It was founded in 1935 with the name 'CD Armonia Egara'. It is best known for its field hockey department but it also has tennis, padel and golf sections.

It plays in the Pla del Bon Aire facilities. It is one of the best teams in Spain, having won 15 Spanish league titles.

Sports  
 Field hockey
 Tennis
 Padel
 Golf
 Equestrianism
 Gymnastics
 Swimming

Honours

Men
División de Honor
 Winners (15): 1970–71, 1971–72, 1972–73, 1973–74, 1974–75, 1978–79, 1991–92, 1992–93, 1995–96, 1997–98, 1998–99, 1999–2000, 2000–01, 2015–16, 2018–19
Copa del Rey
 Winners (18): 1921, 1952, 1961, 1963, 1965, 1968, 1969, 1971, 1972, 1973, 1993, 1998, 1999, 2000, 2007, 2009, 2018, 2021
EuroHockey Club Champions Cup
 Runners-up (2): 1993, 1999

Current squad

Men's squad

Women's squad

References

External links

 
Catalan field hockey clubs
Field hockey clubs established in 1935
1935 establishments in Spain
Sport in Terrassa